The Canara Coffee House is the oldest cafe in Vadodara, Gujarat, India. This cafe is mostly famous for  Puna Misal which is a perfect mixture of savoury and spices in a sweet flavour.

History

History of Canara Coffee house have a lot to talk about the history of Baroda. This restaurant was started in 1950's. Back in those days this was the only cafe in the city.

Baroda is a place with a high historical importance, the palace and the university has survived with the modern cultural flow catching up with the modern times. Due to the Maharashtrian roots of the rulers of the city a lot of things here are a blend of Maharashtrian and Gujarati Culture.

Food habits of Baroda also evolved with the times which resulted in different unique dishes like Sev Usual, Poona Misal.

Management

Canara Coffee House, which was located just behind the Fire Station, off Sursagar Lake in Baroda.is now shifted permanently near Premanand hall opposite Lakdi pool Dandia Bazar. Canara Coffee house is run by Pandurang Kudva.

See also

 List of coffeehouse chains

References

External links
  Facebook Fan Page.

Coffeehouses and cafés in India
Tourist attractions in Vadodara